Sabri Mosbah (born January 30, 1982) is a Tunisian singer, composer and guitarist. He is the son of singer Slah Mosbah.

Biography 

Sabry was born and raised in Tunis, in Bardo. Radio France Internationale has called him "one of the ambassadors of a new musical path." He is singer composer and Guitarist. and the son of singer Slah Mosbah.

He launched his YouTube channel in 2015 with the Kitch’Session, videos in which he made various covers of Tunisian songs but also classics from the rock repertoire, such as Creep from Radiohead.

on November 24, 2017, Sabry Mosbah released his album "Mes Racines chez Accords Croisés".

References

External links 

1982 births
21st-century Tunisian male singers
Living people
Tunisian guitarists
Male guitarists
21st-century guitarists
Musicians from Tunis